Władysław Nehrebecki (14 June 1923, Borysław, Poland (now Boryslav, Ukraine) – 28 December 1978, Katowice) was a Polish animator and cartoon director.

He is best known as the creator of the animated characters Bolek and Lolek. Bolek and Lolek are Władysław Nehrebecki's sons, and Lolek (in real life Roman Nehrebecki) is one of the owners of copyright and he recreated the cartoon series in a comic book Bolek's and Lolek's Cousins' Adventures (Przygody kuzynów Bolka i Lolka). Only one comic book was created and was released in August 2002.

References

External links

1923 births
1978 deaths
People from Boryslav
People from Lwów Voivodeship
Polish animators
Polish television directors
Polish animated film directors
Recipient of the Meritorious Activist of Culture badge